Corus monodi is a species of beetle in the family Cerambycidae. It was described by Lepesme and Breuning in 1953.

References

monodi
Beetles described in 1953